Bleher's rainbowfish (Chilatherina bleheri) is a species of rainbowfish in the subfamily Melanotaeniinae.

Etymology
It is named in honor of Heiko Bleher, a German botanist and ichthyologist.

Distribution and habitat
Bleher's rainbowfish is found in Lake Holmes in the lower Mamberamo system of West Papua in Indonesia. With a preference for shallow, abundant plant life, this rainbowfish lives in a foothill region surrounded by jungle.

References

Chilatherina
Freshwater fish of Western New Guinea
Taxonomy articles created by Polbot
Taxa named by Gerald R. Allen
Fish described in 1985